Del Rosario, in Spanish and Italian languages, and do Rosário in Portuguese language is a surname that has as its etymology, the Latin preposition, "de" meaning "of the" and the Latin noun "rosarium", meaning "rosegarden" or "garland of roses" but in this case, takes the meaning of "rosary", the Roman Catholic devotion to the Virgin Mary.  In fact, its origins are from the Middle Ages, around the 12th century, and it is much associated with the cult of the Virgin Mary at the time when the rose became part of the holy aura, which surrounded anything to do with Mary, and the Our Lady of the Rosary's Feast of the Holy Rosary.  This surname is common in Romance languages regions, and is also one of the most common surnames in the Philippines and other islands of Spanish East Indies since the mid-19th century, and where it is one of the most popular clans together with Cruz, Santos, Reyes, Gonzales, Bautista, García, Mendoza, Aquino, and others, because there are so many people that have this surname.

People with the surname del Rosario
 Albert del Rosario (born 1939), Filipino diplomat, former Secretary of Foreign Affairs for the Philippines
 Anacleto del Rosario (1860–1895), Filipino chemist
 Ella del Rosario, multi-awarded Spanish-American-Filipina recording artist, iconic music hall of fame singer-celebrity
 Andrea del Rosario (born 1977), Filipina actress, model and politician
 Anton del Rosario (born 1981), American-born Filipino footballer
 Antonio del Rosario (born 1946), Filipino politician
 Aric del Rosario (1940–2020), Filipino basketball player and coach
 Enerio del Rosario (born 1985), Dominican former Major League Baseball pitcher
 Francisco del Rosario Sánchez (1817–1861), Dominican politician
 Gina del Rosario (born 1986), Dominican female volleyball player, twin sister of Ginnette Del Rosario
 Ginnette del Rosario (born 1986), Dominican female volleyball player, twin sister of Gina Del Rosario
 Manuel del Rosario (1915–2009), Filipino prelate of the Roman Catholic Church
 Maria Beatriz del Rosario Arroyo (1884–1957), Filipino nun
 María del Rosario de Silva, Duchess of Alba (1900–1934), Spanish aristocrat and socialite
 María del Rosario Espinoza (born 1987), Mexican taekwondo practitioner
 Rosario Weiss Zorrilla, born Maria del Rosario Weiss (1814–1843), Spanish painter and engraver, possibly a daughter of Francisco Goya
 Martin del Rosario (born 1992), Filipino actor
 Monsour del Rosario (born 1965), Filipino taekwondo champion
 Raquel del Rosario (born 1982), a Spanish singer
 Liezle del Rosario (born 1982), an Industrial Engineer, CEO of LR Interior Design Solution
 Rosa del Rosario (1917–2005), Filipina film actress
 Shane del Rosario (1983–2013), American mixed martial artist and kickboxer
 Tomás del Rosario (1857–1913), Filipino judge and politician
 Clarence del rosario (born 1992), Filipino surgeon

People with the surname do Rosário
 Arthur Bispo do Rosário (born 1909?), Artist
 Carlos Agostinho do Rosário (born 1954), Prime Minister of Mozambique
 Filipe Neri António Sebastião do Rosário Ferrão (born 1953), Roman Catholic prelate, Patriarch of the East Indies and Archbishop of Goa and Daman
 Gualberto do Rosário (born 1950), former Prime Minister of Cape Verde
 Hélder Miguel do Rosário (born 1980), Portuguese footballer
 Maria do Rosário (born 1966), Brazilian teacher and politician

See also
Rosario (surname)

References

Spanish-language surnames
Surnames of Spanish origin
Italian-language surnames
Portuguese-language surnames